Henry Freeman may refer to:
 Henry Freeman (lifeboatman) (1835–1904), Whitby fisherman and lifeboatman
 Henry Blanchard Freeman (1837–1915), U.S. Army general, Medal of Honor recipient during the American Civil War
 Henry Stanhope Freeman (died 1865), governor of the Lagos Colony
 Martin Henry Freeman (1826–1889), first black president of an American college

See also
Harry Freeman (disambiguation)
Henry Freedman